Amara Wichithong (born 27 April 1963) is a Thai windsurfer. She competed in the women's Lechner A-390 event at the 1992 Summer Olympics.

References

External links
 
 

1963 births
Living people
Amara Wichithong
Female windsurfers
Amara Wichithong
Amara Wichithong
Sailors at the 1992 Summer Olympics – Lechner A-390
Place of birth missing (living people)
Amara Wichithong